Following a 10-year tenure with their record labels, funk band the Brand New Heavies released two greatest hits albums titled Trunk Funk, a wordplay on the band's long standing elephant logo.

Biography 
Trunk Funk – The Best of The Brand New Heavies was released 13 September 1999 in the UK on FFRR Records. It highlights the group's dance and pop oriented UK hits, with many appearing in remixed, edited, or radio-friendly formats. Because lead singer Siedah Garrett left the band in 1998, and previous lead N'Dea Davenport was out promoting her solo debut, UK singer Carleen Anderson fills in on vocals for this album. Three new recordings appear here, "Try My Love," the Marvin Gaye redux "Saturday Nite," and a cover of "Apparently Nothing," originally done by Anderson's former band Young Disciples. This compilation was not released in the United States.

Trunk Funk Classics 1991–2000 was released 17 October 2000 in the US by Delicious Vinyl Records. This collection has an entirely different track listing than the above release. Where the UK Trunk Funk release highlighted dance and pop-oriented Heavies singles, this release focuses on 70's soul influenced cuts like "Brother Sister," the J. Dilla remix of "Sometimes" featuring rapper Q-Tip, and "Put the Funk Back in It." The US Trunk Funk also includes two tracks from Heavy Rhyme Experience, Vol. 1, the band's collaboration with a host of hip-hop artists. Among the previously unreleased tracks are the video edit of "Dream Come True '92" and the new track "Finish What You Started" marking lead singer N'Dea Davenport's much-desired return to the band.

Track listing

International release
Trunk Funk – The Best of The Brand New Heavies (International Release)

US Release 
Trunk Funk Classics 1991–2000 (US Release)

Personnel

Carleen Anderson – vocals on "Saturday Nite," "Apparently Nothing," and "Try My Love"
Simon Bartholomew  – guitar, percussion & background vocals
N'Dea Davenport  – percussion, keyboards, vocals, background vocals on tracks
Siedah Garrett - vocals on tracks "Sometimes", "You Are the Universe", "You've Got a Friend", and "Shelter"
Jan Kincaid  – percussion, drums, keyboards, vocals, background vocals
Andrew Levy  – bass, percussion, keyboards, background vocals, string arrangements

References

The Brand New Heavies albums
1999 albums